John F. Kennedy High School is a high school located in the Gentilly neighborhood of New Orleans, Louisiana in the United States. It is a charter school under the Orleans Parish School Board (OPSB).

History

Original John F. Kennedy High School
The original John F. Kennedy High School located in City Park closed due to flooding and damage caused by Hurricane Katrina in the fall of 2005.

Greater Gentilly High School
In August 2009, a $39 million school building opened at 6026 Paris Ave. and became Greater Gentilly High School.

Lake Area New Tech Early College High School
In 2011, Greater Gentilly High School and Thurgood Marshall Early College High School merged and Lake Area New Tech Early College High School opened in the former Greater Gentilly High School building.

John F. Kennedy High School
In July 2018, John F. Kennedy High School reopened in the former Greater Gentilly and Lake Area New Tech Early College High School building and was run by the New Beginnings Schools Foundation. In July 2019, it was announced that The New Beginnings Foundation would relinquish control of John F. Kennedy following a grades changing scandal.

In August 2019 KIPP New Orleans stated that it was interested in taking management of this school. OPSB Superintendent Henderson Lewis, Jr. gave approval that month; it would be effective the next school year.

Extracurricular activities

Beta Club
Cheerleading
Choir
Dance Team
Debate Team
DECA
Drama Club
Drill Team

Flag Team
Majorettes
Marching Band
National Honor Society
Robotics Club
Student Ambassadors
Student Council

Athletics

John F. Kennedy athletics
John F. Kennedy athletics competes in the LHSAA.
Baseball
Basketball (Boys and Girls)
Football
Softball
Track & Field (Boys and Girls)
Volleyball

Original John F. Kennedy athletics history
Baseball
2003–2004 - State Playoffs

1993-94 District Champions State 
Playoffs

1995-96 District Champions State Playoffs

Basketball
1980–1981 Co-District Champions, State Playoffs (Boys)
1993-94 District Champions State Playoffs 
1994-95 District Champions State Playoffs 
1995-96  State Playoffs 
2002–2003 - State Playoffs, Regional (Boys)
2003–2004 - State Playoffs, Regional (Boys)
2003–2004 - State Playoffs, (Girls)
2004–2005 - State Playoffs, Regional (Boys)
2004–2005 - State Playoffs, (Girls)

Football
1970–1971 - State Playoffs
1971–1972 - State Playoffs
1985–1986 - State Playoffs
1986–1987 - State Playoffs
1990–1991 - State Playoffs
1999–2000 - State Playoffs
2000–2001 - State Playoffs
2001–2002 - State Playoffs
2002–2003 - State Playoffs

Track and Field
1981–1982 - 9-AAAA District / City Champions; State runner-up

Wrestling
1970–1971 - State Runner Up
1971–1972 - State Champions

Notable alumni

Original John F. Kennedy alumni
Terence Blanchard - American jazz trumpeter, movie score writer predominantly with Spike Lee Films  
David Duke - Former Republican Louisiana State Representative in District 81 and member of the KKK. 
Wayne Ferrara - Freelance Actor - Treme, Bending the Rules, A Perfect Day, Pride, Pizza My Heart. 
Noni Frank - Theatre Arts - Global Hospitality Entrepreneur (Also attended NOCCA)
Dion Gales - NFL defensive end
Randy Jackson - Rock musician with the band Zebra
Carldell Johnson - NBA point guard. Attended JFK and transferred to Marion Abramson High School for his fourth (senior) year of high school.
JoNell Kennedy - Actress, Dreamgirls, Guess Who
Irvin Mayfield Jr. - American jazz trumpeter. (Later attended and graduated from NOCCA) 
Lonnie Varisco - Director of the Culinary Institute of New Orleans
Art Zeno - Administrative Assistant of Men's Basketball for Virginia Tech University

References

External links
 John F. Kennedy High School website

Charter schools in New Orleans
Public high schools in New Orleans
2005 disestablishments in Louisiana
Educational institutions established in 2018
2018 establishments in Louisiana